Fouilloy is the name of the following communes in France:

 Fouilloy, Oise, in the Oise department
 Fouilloy, Somme, in the Somme department